Yablanitsa Glacier, Smith Island  
 Yagodina Knoll, Trinity Peninsula  
 Yakoruda Glacier, Greenwich Island  
 Yambol Peak, Livingston Island 
 Yamen Glacier, Sentinel Range 
 Yamforina Cove, Oscar II Coast
 Yana Point, Livingston Island  
 Yankov Gap, Livingston Island  
 Yantra Cove, Livingston Island 
 Yarebitsa Cove, Smith Island 
 Yarlovo Nunatak, Trinity Peninsula  
 Yasen Point, Livingston Island  
 Yastreb Island, Wilhelm Archipelago
 Yato Rocks, Wilhelm Archipelago
 Yatrus Promontory, Trinity Peninsula  
 Yavorov Peak, Livingston Island  
 Yoglav Crag, Trinity Peninsula
 Yordanov Nunatak, Oscar II Coast 
 Yordanov Island, South Orkney Islands
 Yovkov Point, Greenwich Island  
 Yozola Glacier, Alexander Island 
 Yrvind Island, Nelson Island 
 Yunak Peak, Brabant Island
 Yundola Cove, Robert Island

See also 
 Bulgarian toponyms in Antarctica

External links 
 Bulgarian Antarctic Gazetteer
 SCAR Composite Gazetteer of Antarctica
 Antarctic Digital Database (ADD). Scale 1:250000 topographic map of Antarctica with place-name search.
 L. Ivanov. Bulgarian toponymic presence in Antarctica. Polar Week at the National Museum of Natural History in Sofia, 2–6 December 2019

Bibliography 
 J. Stewart. Antarctica: An Encyclopedia. Jefferson, N.C. and London: McFarland, 2011. 1771 pp.  
 L. Ivanov. Bulgarian Names in Antarctica. Sofia: Manfred Wörner Foundation, 2021. Second edition. 539 pp.  (in Bulgarian)
 G. Bakardzhieva. Bulgarian toponyms in Antarctica. Paisiy Hilendarski University of Plovdiv: Research Papers. Vol. 56, Book 1, Part A, 2018 – Languages and Literature, pp. 104-119 (in Bulgarian)
 L. Ivanov and N. Ivanova. Bulgarian names. In: The World of Antarctica. Generis Publishing, 2022. pp. 114-115. 

Antarctica
 
Bulgarian toponyms in Antarctica
Names of places in Antarctica